Burned Down the Enemy is the third album of heavy metal band Burning Point. The album was released in Asia by Soundholic on 20 December 2006 and in Europe on 19 January 2007 by Metal Heaven.

It was recorded at Helgate studios in Oulu by Jukka Jokikokko. Mixing was made in Tonebox studios by Kakke Vähäkuopus. Album was mastered in Finnvox studios by Minerva Pappi.

Track listing
Parasite
Heart Of Gold
Dawn Of The Ancient War
Hell Awaits
From The Beginning Of It All
Icebound
Deceiver
Eye For An Eye
To Hell And Back
Against The Madness Of Time
Burned Down The Enemy
My Reign, My Fire (bonus track)
Heart Of Gold - Demo Version (bonus track)
The Road To Hell (bonus track)
Nocturnal Sight (bonus track)
Bring Me Oblivion (bonus track)

References

Burning Point albums
2006 albums